The Prior of Beauly (later Commendator of Beauly) was the head of the Valliscaulian monastic community and lands of Beauly Priory, Beauly, Inverness-shire. It was probably founded in 1230. It became Cistercian on April 16, 1510. The following are a list of priors and commendators:

List of priors

 Geoffrey, 1312
 Robert, 1341-1357
 Simon, 1362
 Maurice, 1336x1372
 Thomas, x 1407
 Matthew alias Walter, 1407-1411
 Cristin MacDonald (Donaldson), 1411
 Gilbert MacPherson, 1430
 Alexander Fraser, 1430-1471
 John Finlay, 1472-1480
 Hugh Fraser, x 1498
 Thomas Ramsay, 1498
 Dugald (Callus) McRory, 1498-1514
 Nicholas Brachane, 1525-1528
 James Haswell, 1528
 David Murray, 1528
 James de Baldoven, 1529-1531

List of commendators

 Robert Reid, 1531-1553
 Walter Reid, ?1553-1572
 John Fraser, 1573-1579
 Thomas Fraser, 1579
 Adam Cuming, 1581-1607
 Alexander Douglas, 1606
 James Hay de Kingask, 1607-1612
 George Strang, 1612

Notes

Bibliography
 Cowan, Ian B. & Easson, David E., Medieval Religious Houses: Scotland With an Appendix on the Houses in the Isle of Man, Second Edition, (London, 1976), p. 84
 Watt, D.E.R. & Shead, N.F. (eds.), The Heads of Religious Houses in Scotland from the 12th to the 16th Centuries, The Scottish Records Society, New Series, Volume 24, (Edinburgh, 2001), pp. 15–18

See also
 Beauly Priory

Beauly
Beauly
Beauly